Pilehgah (also Romanized as Pīlehgāh; also known as Pīlag) is a village in Keshvar Rural District, Papi District, Khorramabad County, Lorestan Province, Iran. At the 2006 census, its population was 147, in 32 families.

References 

Towns and villages in Khorramabad County